Mary de Piro is a Maltese artist (born in Valletta, 1946). 

She studied art at a young age while at boarding school at Badia a Ripoli in Florence and later at the Accademia di Belle Arti di Firenze. Her first exhibition was held in Wisconsin, in the course of a stay in the United States. Her first solo exhibition in Malta brought her critical acclaim owing to the confidence of her brushwork and choice of large format canvases. This led to commissions from corporate patrons, through curator Richard England. In 1975 she moved to the UK, where she raised a family while continuing to paint, moving into the field of portraiture and sacred art.  Over the years she mainly participated in collective exhibitions in the England, Malta, and Italy. Mary de Piro is best known for her landscape paintings, particularly those which evoke the Mediterranean light of the Maltese countryside.

Exhibitions 
Personal exhibitions
1968 La Grande Italia, Boston Store, Milwaukee, Wisconsin, United States
1969 Mazaron Gallery, Paceville, Malta
1971 National Museum, Auberge de Provence, Valletta, Malta
1975 Nails Cellars Gallery, Devon, England
1977 ‘Window on Mary de Piro’, National Museum of Fine Arts, Valletta, Malta
2005 Mary de Piro (duo exhibition), Casino Maltese, Valletta, Malta
2014 Palazzo de Piro, Mdina, Malta
2016 Bank of Valletta Head Office, Malta

Collective
1967 Bank of Alderney Art Gallery, Valletta
1967 National Museum of Malta, Valletta, Malta
1969 Biennale Internazionale di Pittura Contemporanea, Pistoia, Italy
1969 Sacred Art Exhibition, St John's Co-Cathedral, Valletta; The cathedral, Mdina, Malta
1970 The Permanent Art Gallery, MSAMC, Palazzo de La Salle, Valletta
1970 Mazaron Art Gallery, Paceville, Malta
1970 ‘Art from Malta’, Richard Demarco Gallery, Edinburgh, Scotland
1970 River Oaks Gallery, Houston, Texas, United States
1973 Barclays Bank Art Exhibition, Barclays Bank, Kingsway, Valletta, Malta
1973 Malta Government Tourist Board, Vienna, Austria
1982 ‘Maltese Women Artists’, Gallerija Fenici, Valletta, Malta
1989 ‘Artisti Maltesi a Firenze’, Galleria Renzo Spagnoli Arte, Florence, Italy
1994 ‘European Art’, Chamber of Commerce, Valletta, Malta
1994 ‘Wardour Chapel Appeal’, Christie's, London, U.K.
1996 Sacred Art Biennale, Cathedral Museum, Mdina, Malta
1997 - ‘Art for Youth’, Mall Galleries, London, U.K.
1998 ‘Charity Art’, Holy Trinity Brompton, London, U.K.
2000 ‘Maltese Talents Abroad’, National Museum of Fine Arts, Valletta, Malta
2004 ‘Drawn into the Light’, Contemporary Christian Art Exhibition, Wapping, London
2008 ‘Bloodline’, Gallery G, Lija, Malta
2008 ‘malta4euro’, European Commission Representation, London, U.K.
2008 ‘Mediterraneo: A Sea that unites’, Italian Cultural Institute, London, U.K.
2008 - 2015 Annual Exhibition, Hurlingham Club, London, England

References

External sources
Personal website

Maltese artists
Living people
Maltese expatriates in Italy
Maltese expatriates in England
1946 births